Mansoor Ahmed Batt (7 January 1968 – 12 May 2018) is a hockey player.

Career
Ahmed played as a goalkeeper and Captain for the Pakistan national hockey team from 1986 to 2000. He played 338 International matches and participated in three Olympic Games. He became the recipient of a bronze medal in 1992 Olympic Games. Ahmed played three consecutive World Cups and won 1994 World Cup Hockey Championship (World Cup). Also won silver medal in 1990 world Cup Hockey Championship. He played 10 Champions Trophy games and won gold medal in 1994. He played three Asian Games and won a gold medal in 1990 at Beijing, China. In his career, he earned 12 gold, 12 silver and 8 bronze medals in international hockey tournaments.

He was declared All Asian Stars Hockey Team member in 1996 and also declared World Eleven Hockey team members in 1994. Ahmed was declared four times as the best goalkeeper of the tournament in his lifetime career. He was also the flag carrier of the Pakistani contingent in the 1996 Atlanta Olympics in Atlanta, US.

In his outstanding performance in the field of hockey, Government of Pakistan awarded him the President Award in 1988. He was also awarded the Pride of Performance award by the President of Pakistan in 1994.

Ahmed was also involved in hockey as a coach. He was the National hockey coach of Pakistan junior hockey team in 2000 and was appointed as specialist goalkeeper coach of Bangladesh national hockey team in 2014. He also was appointed director of Pakistan Hockey Federation's hockey academies in 2010.  Besides a player, Ahmed was a social activist and worked as an ambassador with different organizations like "Right to Play" and "Athlete Ambassador". He was also appointed as an ambassador for 'No Smoking Campaign' by the Government of Pakistan. He had the honour to be announced as speaker for FIFA World Cup 2022, Qatar. He was also invited as a guest for Special Olympics, Los Angeles, US in 2015.

Illness and death
On 22 April 2018, Ahmed revealed that he needed a heart transplant and was seeking a medical visa from the Government of India. He was under treatment at the National Institute of Cardiovascular Diseases in Karachi.

Mansoor Ahmed died on 12 May 2018, in Karachi, Pakistan. In the last three years of his life, he had been suffering from a heart ailment. A few weeks before his death, Ahmed had complications originating from a pacemaker and stents implanted in his heart. On 13 May 2018, he was laid to rest in Karachi.

See also 
Pakistan Hockey Federation

References

External links
 

1968 births
2018 deaths
Olympic field hockey players of Pakistan
Pakistani male field hockey players
Field hockey players at the 1984 Summer Olympics
Field hockey players at the 1988 Summer Olympics
Field hockey players at the 1992 Summer Olympics
Field hockey players at the 1996 Summer Olympics
Olympic bronze medalists for Pakistan
Olympic medalists in field hockey
Recipients of the Pride of Performance
Medalists at the 1992 Summer Olympics
Field hockey players from Karachi
Field hockey players at the 1986 Asian Games
Field hockey players at the 1990 Asian Games
Field hockey players at the 1994 Asian Games
Asian Games medalists in field hockey
Asian Games gold medalists for Pakistan
Asian Games silver medalists for Pakistan
Asian Games bronze medalists for Pakistan
Medalists at the 1986 Asian Games
Medalists at the 1990 Asian Games
Medalists at the 1994 Asian Games
1990 Men's Hockey World Cup players